Dagmara Domińczyk (born July 17, 1976) is a Polish-American actress and author. She has appeared in the films Rock Star (2001), The Count of Monte Cristo (2002), Kinsey (2004), Trust the Man (2005), Lonely Hearts (2006), Running with Scissors (2006), Higher Ground (2011), The Letter (2012), The Immigrant (2013), Big Stone Gap (2014), A Woman, a Part (2016), The Assistant (2019), and The Lost Daughter (2021). Domińczyk also has a main role in the HBO comedy-drama television series Succession (2018–present).

In 2013, she became a published author with the release of her novel The Lullaby of Polish Girls. She is married to actor Patrick Wilson.

Early life and education
Dagmara was born in Kielce, the daughter of Aleksandra and Mirosław Domińczyk, a member of the Polish Solidarity movement. She moved with her family to New York City in 1983 as asylum seekers due to her parents' political associations (her father's involvement with Amnesty International and the Solidarity movement). She is the older sister of actresses Marika Domińczyk and Veronika Domińczyk.

Dagmara was educated at Fiorello H. LaGuardia High School in Manhattan. She went on to study at Carnegie Mellon University's School of Drama in Pittsburgh, from which she graduated in 1998.

Career
In 1999, Dagmara made her acting debut on Broadway as Anna Friel's understudy in Patrick Marber's production of Closer. The following year, she made her feature film debut as Claire in the Stuart Blumberg-penned romantic comedy Keeping the Faith, also featuring Ben Stiller and Edward Norton. In 2001, she starred as Tania Asher in Rock Star, and in 2002, portrayed Edmond Dantès' fiancée, Mercédès Mondego (née Herrera), in the screen adaptation of The Count of Monte Cristo.

In 2003, she returned to Broadway playing Caroline Bramble in a production of Enchanted April. Dagmara has also had guest starring roles in television series such as Kinsey (2004), 24 (2005), The Bedford Diaries (2006), The Good Wife (2011), Suits (2011), Person of Interest (2012), and Boardwalk Empire (2014). In 2006, she appeared in the Todd Robinson-directed Lonely Hearts with John Travolta, and the black comedy film Running with Scissors alongside an all-star cast including Annette Bening, Joseph Fiennes, and Gwyneth Paltrow.

In 2011, Dagmara co-starred in Vera Farmiga's directorial debut drama film Higher Ground as a religious group member who develops a brain tumor. The following year, she appeared in the psychological thriller film The Letter with Winona Ryder and James Franco. She next co-starred in James Gray's drama film The Immigrant (2013), alongside Marion Cotillard, Joaquin Phoenix, and Jeremy Renner.

In 2013, she published her first novel, The Lullaby of Polish Girls, which was loosely based on her youth in her native Poland.

In 2014, Dagmara starred in the Polish political thriller film Jack Strong, directed by Władysław Pasikowski, and the black comedy film Let's Kill Ward's Wife, directed by her brother-in-law Scott Foley.

Personal life
In June 2005, Dagmara married actor and fellow Carnegie Mellon alumnus Patrick Wilson. They have appeared together in the films Running with Scissors (2006), Jack Strong (2014), Big Stone Gap (2014), and Let's Kill Ward's Wife (2014). On June 23, 2006, she gave birth to their first child, son Kalin Patrick Wilson. Domińczyk gave birth to their second son, Kassian McCarrell Wilson, on August 9, 2009. The family resides in Montclair, New Jersey. She is the sister-in-law of actor Scott Foley, who is married to her sister Marika.

Filmography

Film

Television

Voiceovers and audio narration 
Someone to Love by Jude Devereaux
Day After Night by Anita Diamant
Every Note Played by Lisa Genova
The Other Queen by Phillipa Gregory
The Boleyn Inheritance by Phillipa Gregory
Show No Fear by Perri O'Shaughnessy
In Secret Service by Mitch Silver

Stage

References

External links

 
 

1976 births
20th-century American actresses
21st-century American actresses
Actresses from New Jersey
Actresses from New York City
American film actresses
American stage actresses
American television actresses
Carnegie Mellon University College of Fine Arts alumni
Fiorello H. LaGuardia High School alumni
Living people
People from Montclair, New Jersey
Polish emigrants to the United States
Polish stage actresses
Writers from New Jersey
Writers from New York City
Polish film actresses
Polish television actresses
20th-century Polish actresses
21st-century Polish actresses